A solar lamp, also known as a solar light or solar lantern, is a lighting system composed of an LED lamp, solar panels, battery, charge controller and there may also be an inverter. The lamp operates on electricity from batteries, charged through the use of solar panel (solar photovoltaic panel)

Solar-powered household lighting can replace other light sources like candles or kerosene lamps. Solar lamps have a lower operating cost than kerosene lamps because renewable energy from the sun is free, unlike fuel. In addition, solar lamps produce no indoor air pollution unlike kerosene lamps. However, solar lamps generally have a higher initial cost, and are weather dependent.

Solar lamps for use in rural situations often have the capability of providing a supply of electricity for other devices, such as for charging cell phones. The costs of solar lamps have continued to fall in recent years as the components and lamps have been mass-produced in ever greater numbers.

History 

Some solar photovoltaics use Monocrystalline silicon or poly-crystalline silicon panels, while newer technologies have used thin-film solar cells. Since  modern solar cells were introduced in 1954 at Bell labs, advances in solar cell efficiency at converting light into electric power, and modern manufacturing techniques combined with efficiencies of scale have led to an international growth of photovoltaics.

The first solar light patent was filed by Maurice E Paradise in 1955

As of 2016, LED lamps use only about 10% of the energy an incandescent lamp requires. Efficiency in production of LED lamps has led to increased adoption as an alternative to older electric lightings

Components
The complete structure of a solar lamp is shown in Figure 1.

Solar panels 

Most solar panels are made out of single crystalline silicon, a semiconductor material. A solar cell has two different layers of silicon. The lower layer has less electrons and hence has a slight positive charge due to the negative charge nature of electrons. In addition, the upper layer has more electrons and has slightly negative charge. A potential barrier is created between these two layers.

When the stream of light particles called photons enter, they give up their energy to the atoms in the silicon. It promotes one electron from a covalent bond to a next energy level from upper layer to the lower layer. This promotion of an electron allows freer movement within the crystal which produces a current. More light shines through, more electrons move around hence more current flows between. This process is called photovoltaic and photoelectric effect. Photovoltaic systems directly convert sunlight into electricity.

Solar panels are made out of layers of different materials, as you can see in Figure 2, in order of glass, encapsulate, crystalline cells, encapsulate, back sheet, junction box and lastly frame. The encapsulate keeps out moisture and contaminants which could cause problems.

Battery 

A battery is usually housed within a metal or plastic case. Inside the case are electrodes including cathodes and anodes where chemical reactions occur. A separator also exists between cathode and anode which stops the electrodes reacting together at the same time as allowing electrical charge to flow freely between the two. Lastly, the collector conducts a charge from the battery to outside.

Batteries inside solar lamps usually use gel electrolyte technology with high performance in deep discharging, in order to enable use in extreme ranges of temperature. It may also use lead-acid, nickel metal hydride, nickel cadmium, or lithium.

This part of the lamp saves up energy from the solar panel and provides power when needed at night when there is no light energy available.

In general, the efficiency of photovoltaic energy conversion is limited for physical reasons. Around 24% of solar radiation of a long wavelength is not absorbed. 33% is heat lost to surroundings, and further losses are of approximately 15-20%. Only 23% is absorbed, which means a battery is a crucial part of solar lamp.

Charge controller 

This section controls the entire working systems to protect battery charge. It ensures, under any circumstances including extreme weather conditions with large temperature difference, the battery does not overcharge or over discharge and damage the battery even further.

This section also includes additional parts such as light controller, time controller, sound, temperature compensation, lighting protection, reverse polarity protection and AC transfer switches which ensure sensitive back-up loads work normally when outage occurs.

Working principles 

LED lights are used due to their high luminous efficiency and long life. Under the control of a DC charge controller, non-contact control automatically turns on the light at dark and switches off at daytime. It sometimes also combines with time controllers to set certain time for it to automatically switch light on and off.

As shown in Figure 3, the chip includes microchip(R), B-, B+, S- and S+. S+ and S- are both connected to solar panels with wire, one of which has plus charge and the other minus charge. B- and B+ are attached to two batteries in this case. The light will be shown through the LED light when all of these are connected.

Benefits 

Solar lamps are easier for customers to install and maintain as they do not require an electricity cable. Solar lamps can benefit owners with reduced maintenance cost and costs of electricity bills. Solar lamps can also be used in areas where there is no electrical grid or remote areas that lack a reliable electricity supply. There are many stories of people with lung disease, eye deterioration, burns and sometimes even death simply because they do not have a healthy alternative to light at night.  Women have felt unsafe walking to the toilet outside after dark.  Babies are being delivered by midwives using only a candle, and students cannot study when the sun goes down for lack of light, leading to increased illiteracy and perpetual poverty.  These are the realities for over 1 billion people around the globe.   Lack of lighting equates to continued poverty felt around the world.
In solar energy lamp it converts light energy into electrical energy, i.e. It is convenient to our daily life.

Solar energy output is limited by weather and can be less effective if it is cloudy, wet, or winter.

Households switching to solar lamps from kerosene lamps also gain from health risk associated with kerosene emissions. Kerosene often has negative impacts on human lungs.

The use of solar energy minimises the creation of pollution indoors, where kerosene has been linked to cases of health issues. However, photovoltaic panels are made out of silicon and other toxic metals, including lead that can be difficult to dispose of.

The use of solar lights improves education for students who live in households without electricity. When the nonprofit Unite to Light donated solar-lamps to schools in a remote region of Kwa Zulu Natal in South Africa, test scores and pass rates improved by over 30%. The light gives students added time to study after dark.

A 2017 experimental study in un-electrified areas of northern Bangladesh found that the use of solar lanterns decreased total household expenditure, increased children’s home-study hours and increased school attendance. It did not however improve the children's educational achievement to any large extent.

Uses

Solar street light 

These lights provide a convenient and cost-effective way to light streets at night without the need of AC electrical grids for pedestrians and drivers. They may have individual panels for each lamp of a system, or may have a large central solar panel and battery bank to power multiple lamps.

Rural 

In rural India, solar lamps, commonly called solar lanterns, using either LEDs or CFLs, are being used to replace kerosene lamps,  and other cheap alternatives of lighting. Especially in areas where electricity is otherwise difficult to access, solar lamps are very useful, and it also improves the quality of life.

Africa, which has the lowest electricity access rate globally at 40% has benefited greatly through access to solar lamps and complete home lighting solutions.

Marine 
Marine settings are increasingly using LED solar lights as alternatives to conventional lighting. The remote nature of boating and sailing makes power hard to come by and thus lends itself to self-sufficient technologies like solar boat lighting

Economics
American investors have been working towards developing a $10 / unit solar lantern for replacement of kerosene lamps.

Solar home lighting solutions can be expensive to purchase. Off-grid solar organizations offer solar home lighting systems through innovative financial mechanisms such as the Pay-As-You-Go model, permitting consumers to power their entire home while paying easy monthly installments. Currently, over 40% of all sales of off-grid solar lighting products in Sub-Saharan Africa are conducted through PayGo, reaching almost 50% in Kenya and 65% in Rwanda.

See also 

 Light tube
 Liter of Light project
 Solar device
 Solar Street Lighting
 Solar thermal collector#Evacuated tube collectors

References

External links

Applications of photovoltaics
Electrical systems
Energy-saving lighting
Light fixtures
Light-emitting diodes
Types of lamp
Solar-powered devices